The Pas de Lona (2,787 m) is a high mountain pass across the Pennine Alps, located in the canton of Valais. It connects Saint-Martin with Grimentz and is the lowest pass between the valleys of Herens and Anniviers. The pass is overlooked by the Becs de Bosson (north) and the Sasseneire (south).

References

External links
Pas de Lona

Mountain passes of Valais
Mountain passes of the Alps